Li Ching (born 7 March 1975 in Doumen, Guangdong, China) is a table tennis player from Hong Kong. He is best known for the joint silver medal he won for Hong Kong at the Athens Olympic in 2004.

Career
Born in Guangdong, Li joined the Chinese national table tennis team in 1990, and won second place at the men's single table tennis competition at the National Cup in China.

Li's performance during his time at the Chinese national team fluctuated wildly, due primarily to switching of tactics. In 1994, Li withdrew from the Chinese national team for health reason, and moved to Hong Kong to join its national table tennis team.

During Li's time on the Hong Kong team, he paired up with Ko Lai Chak as a duo, and achieved legendary status after the duo's silver medal win in Athens. In 2006, the duo won a pair of gold medal in their category at the Asian Games held in Doha. Li himself did not do as well in the solo table tennis discipline, being defeated by fellow Chinese athletes during the semi-final stages.

Li is now a table tennis coach and led the Hong Kong women's team to a bronze at the 2020 Summer Olympics.

References

External links 
 Hong Kong Sports Star Interviews – Li Ching

1975 births
Living people
Hong Kong male table tennis players
Olympic silver medalists for Hong Kong
Olympic table tennis players of Hong Kong
People from Zhuhai
Table tennis players at the 2004 Summer Olympics
Table tennis players at the 2008 Summer Olympics
Place of birth missing (living people)
Olympic medalists in table tennis
World Table Tennis Championships medalists
Asian Games medalists in table tennis
Table tennis players at the 2010 Asian Games
Table tennis players at the 2006 Asian Games
Table tennis players at the 2002 Asian Games
Medalists at the 2004 Summer Olympics
Asian Games gold medalists for Hong Kong
Asian Games bronze medalists for Hong Kong
Medalists at the 2002 Asian Games
Medalists at the 2006 Asian Games
Table tennis players from Guangdong